El Guardián is a magazine published in Argentina.
The magazine came to international attention in 2011 when a staff writer was dismissed for writing grossly violent and misogynist content.

References

External links
 El Guardián website

Magazines published in Argentina
Magazines with year of establishment missing
Spanish-language magazines